Leninist Communist Youth League of the Karelo-Finnish SSR (LKSM KFSSR) was the republican branch of the All Union Leninist Communist Youth League (Komsomol) in the Karelo-Finnish SSR 1940-1956. The first congress of LKSM KFSSR was held June 1-June 3, 1940. The conference elected a Central Committee, with Yuri Andropov as its First Secretary. During the Second World War, the Central Committee of the LKSM KFSSR organized partisan resistance against the occupying forces, both in urban and rural areas.

Andropov continued in the post until 1944.

In total seven congresses of LKSM KFSSR were held. LKSM KFSSR published the newspaper Юные ленинцы (Young Lenin's Follower) and Молодой большевик (Young Bolshevik).

References

Komsomol
Politics of the Republic of Karelia
1940 establishments in the Soviet Union
1956 disestablishments in the Soviet Union